8800 may refer to:
 The year 8800, in the 9th millennium.
 NVIDIA GeForce 8800, a computer graphics card series
 The Altair 8800, an early, experimental desktop-sized computer.
 Nokia 8800, a luxury mobile phone
 Intel iAPX 432, initially named the 8800